The 1979 Supertaça de Portugal was the 1st edition of the Supertaça de Portugal although not the 1st official edition, the annual Portuguese football season-opening match contested by the winners of the previous season's top league and cup competitions (or cup runner-up in case the league- and cup-winning club is the same). The 1979 Supertaça de Portugal took place at the Estádio das Antas in Porto, home of FC Porto on the 17 August 1979, thus opening the 1979-1980 season. It was contested between two team from the city of Porto, F.C. Porto, the winners of the 1978–79 Primeira Divisão, and Boavista F.C., the winners of the 1978–79 Taça de Portugal.

Os Axadrezados defeated the Dragões 2–1 to claim the first Supertaça de Portugal thanks to two goals in either half from centre forward Júlio Augusto.  Boavista saw two players sent off in the last 10 minutes of the game, but Porto were unable to equalise the game. After the match was finished, some confrontations followed with Porto supporters, after the defeat in their home stadium, which resulted in the trophy not being delivered to the winners on the pitch. As a result, the trophy was delivered on the following week at Boavista's home ground, Estádio do Bessa.

Match

Details

References

Supertaça Cândido de Oliveira 1979
1979–80 in Portuguese football
FC Porto matches
Boavista F.C. matches

pt:Supertaça de Portugal de 1979